The 2008 United States House of Representatives elections in Alabama were held on November 4, 2008, to determine the representation of the state of Alabama in the United States House of Representatives, coinciding with the presidential and senatorial elections. Representatives are elected for two-year terms; those elected served in the 111th Congress from January 4, 2009, until January 3, 2011.

Alabama has seven seats in the House, apportioned according to the 2000 United States Census. Its 2007–2008 congressional delegation consisted of five Republicans and two Democrats. It is now four Republicans and three Democrats. District 2 changed party (from open Republican to Democratic). As of 2020, this is the last election in which Democrats won more than one congressional district in Alabama.

Overview

District 1 

The Democratic and Republican primaries were not contested, with incumbent representative Jo Bonner winning the Republican party and Thomas Fuller winning the Democratic primary. However, Fuller withdrew from the race on June 12, 2008, stating he was unable to wage a creditable campaign in the district.

Republican primary

Candidates

Declared
Jo Bonner, Incumbent U.S. representative

Democratic primary

Candidates

Withdrawn
Thomas Fuller

General election
CQ Politics forecasted the race as 'Safe Republican'. Bonner won re-election with over 98% of the vote.

District 2 

This district covers southeastern Alabama, including Dothan and Montgomery. CQ Politics forecasted the race as 'No Clear Favorite'. The Rothenberg Political Report rated it 'Pure Toss-Up'. The Cook Political Report ranked it 'Republican Toss Up'.

Republican Terry Everett, who had represented the district since 1993, decided to retire. Montgomery Mayor Bobby Bright won the Democratic primary. State Representative Jay Love won the Republican run-off election on July 15 against State Senator Harri Anne Smith (campaign website). George W. Bush won 67% in 2004 here. Bright won 50% of the vote to Love's 49%.
Bobby Bright (D) (campaign website)
Jay Love (R) (campaign website)
2nd district race ranking and background from CQ Politics
Alabama District 2 race from OurCampaigns.org
Campaign contributions from OpenSecrets
Love (R) vs Bright (D) graph of collected poll results from Pollster.com

District 3 

The Democratic and Republican primaries were not contested.

Mike D. Rogers (R) - Incumbent (campaign website)
Joshua Segall (D) - Lawyer (campaign website)
Mark Layfield (Independent) - real estate broker, ex-pilot, Navy veteran, and 2006 candidate
CQ Politics forecasted the race as 'Republican Favored'.
3rd district race ranking and background from CQ Politics
Alabama District 3 race from OurCampaigns.org
Campaign contributions from OpenSecrets
Rogers (R-i) vs Segall (D) graph of collected poll results from Pollster.com

District 4 

The Republican primary was uncontested, and Nick Sparks won against Greg Warren in the Democratic primary.
Robert Aderholt (R) - Incumbent (campaign website)
Nick Sparks  (D) - attorney (campaign website)
CQ Politics forecasted the race as 'Safe Republican'.
Alabama District 4 race from OurCampaigns.org
Campaign contributions from OpenSecrets

District 5 

This district includes the counties of Colbert, Lauderdale, Lawrence, Limestone, Madison, Jackson, and parts of Morgan. Democratic incumbent Bud Cramer has represented the district since 1990. He did not seek reelection and endorsed State Senator Parker Griffith. CQ Politics forecasted the race as 'No Clear Favorite'. The Rothenberg Political Report rated it 'Pure Toss-Up'. The Cook Political Report ranked it 'Democrat Toss Up'.

In the June 3, 2008, primary election, eight candidates were running for the seat. On the Democratic side, State Senator Dr. Parker Griffith defeated physicist David Maker ( website), carrying 90% of the vote. Wayne Parker won the Republican runoff on July 15 against attorney Cheryl Baswell Guthrie (campaign website). In the primary, Wayne Parker had failed to gain the necessary 51% of the vote to avoid the runoff. Guthrie had carried 18% of the vote.

A year after his election, Griffith switched parties and ran for a second term in the 2010 Republican primary.

Parker Griffith (D) - State Senator, businessman, and Huntsville's first radiation oncologist (campaign website)
Wayne Parker (R) - Insurance executive, lost to Cramer in 1994 and 1996 (campaign website)
5th District race ranking and background from CQ Politics
Alabama District 5 race from OurCampaigns.org
Campaign contributions from OpenSecrets
LoParker (R) vs Griffith (D) graph of collected poll results from Pollster.com

District 6 

The Democratic and Republican primaries were not contested.
Spencer Bachus (R) - Incumbent (campaign website)
CQ Politics forecasted the race as 'Safe Republican'.
 
Alabama District 6 race from OurCampaigns.org
Campaign contributions from OpenSecrets

District 7 

The Democratic and Republican primaries were not contested.
Artur Davis (D) - Incumbent (campaign website)
Elizabeth Hayes (write-in)
CQ Politics forecasted the race as 'Safe Democrat'.
 
Alabama District 7 race from OurCampaigns.org
Campaign contributions from OpenSecrets

References

External links 

U.S. Congress candidates for Alabama at Project Vote Smart
Alabama U.S. House Races from 2008 Race Tracker
Campaign contributions for Alabama congressional races from OpenSecrets
Election News from Alabama Live news media

2008
Alabama
United States House of Representatives